Terefe Maregu Zewdie (born 1982 in Gojjam), also known as Dereje Maregu and Zwedo Maregu, is an Ethiopian runner who specializes in the 5000 metres. His personal best time is 13:06.39 minutes, achieved in July 2004 in Rome.

His breakthrough year came in 2004: he took the individual bronze medal and team gold in the short race at the 2004 IAAF World Cross Country Championships and then went on to take the 5000 m title at the 2004 African Championships in Athletics. He won the Cross Internacional de Itálica in 2005 and went on to win team gold at the IAAF World Cross Country Championships that year. Tarefe won the Carlsbad 5000 in 2008, beating Mo Farah to the finish line. He also won the Boilermaker Road Race that year. He set a half marathon best of 1:01:14 in late 2009 with a third-place finish behind Haile Gebrselassie at the Oporto Half Marathon.

In 2010, he also took third at the Berlin Half Marathon, running 1:00:24 in wet conditions. He finished in third place at the BIG 25 race (also in Berlin) in May that year, running a time of 1:13:16. He made his marathon debut in October at the Frankfurt Marathon and he completed the race with a sub-2:10 run, securing sixth place in 2:09:03. He was also sixth at the Seoul International Marathon in March 2011, but was much slower (2:15:15) in that race.

Achievements

References

External links

1982 births
Living people
Sportspeople from Amhara Region
Ethiopian male long-distance runners
Ethiopian male cross country runners
21st-century Ethiopian people